The Caddie Hall of Fame recognizes professional golf caddies, others who caddied in their youth and those who support the profession.  It was originally created by the Professional Caddies Association in 1999 but has been administered by the Western Golf Association since 2011.

Inductees

References

External links
 

Golf museums and halls of fame
Golf in the United States
Awards established in 1999
Halls of fame in Illinois
1999 establishments in Illinois